The aftermath of the 1982 Falklands War between the United Kingdom and Argentina affected world geopolitics, the local political culture in Argentina and the UK, military thought, medical treatment, and the lives of those who were directly involved in the war.

Political aftermath
Diplomatic relations between the UK and Argentina were not restored until 1989 under a formula which put the issue of sovereignty to one side (the sovereignty umbrella) and established a framework within which further talks on matters of mutual interest could be held.

Argentina
The Argentine loss of the war led to ever-larger protests against the Galtieri regime and is credited with giving the final push to drive out the military junta that had overthrown Isabel Perón in 1976 and perpetrated the crimes of the Dirty War. Galtieri was forced to resign and elections were held on 30 October 1983 and a new president, Raúl Alfonsín, the Radical Civic Union (UCR) party candidate, took office on 10 December 1983, defeating Italo Luder, the candidate for the Justicialist Party (Peronist movement). In the long term the debacle concluded both the periodic intervention of the Argentine military in politics since the 1930s and the Peronist electoral hegemony since 1945.

In 2009, Argentine authorities in Comodoro Rivadavia ratified a decision made by authorities in Río Grande, Tierra del Fuego (which, according to Argentina, have authority over the islands) charging 70 officers and corporals with inhumane treatment of conscript soldiers during the war. "We have testimony from 23 people about a soldier who was shot to death by a corporal, four other former combatants who starved to death, and at least 15 cases of conscripts who were staked out on the ground", Pablo Vassel, under-secretary of human rights in the province of Corrientes, told Inter Press Service News Agency. There are claims that false testimonies were used as evidence in accusing the Argentine officers and NCOs and Vassel had to step down from his post as under-secretary of human rights of Corrientes in 2010.

The Falkland Islands
The Falkland Islands remained a self-governing British overseas territory, but shortly after the war the British Nationality (Falkland Islands) Act 1983 granted the Islanders British citizenship (replacing British Dependent Territories citizenship), strengthening the link between the Islanders and the UK.  The economy also benefited indirectly from UK military investment and directly from development of fisheries. The future of the Falkland Islanders' link to the UK has been more certain as a result of the war, and the Islands' government remains committed to self-determination and British sovereignty. The only civilian deaths during the war were three women who were killed when a Royal Navy shell hit the house they were sheltering in during a naval bombardment of military targets inside Stanley itself.

United Kingdom
For the United Kingdom, the war cost 258 men, 6 ships (10 others suffered varying degrees of battle damage), 34 aircraft, and £2.778 billion (£9.255 billion in 2018), but the campaign was considered a great victory for the United Kingdom. The months following the war saw the popularity of the Conservative Government increase, with some attributing this rise to the aftermath of the war with others suggesting that the rise in popularity was due to an increase in economic optimism, with the war increasing productivity by 3%. The war did however cause several members of the government to resign, including the Foreign Secretary Lord Carrington, the most recent time that a UK government minister resigned openly in response to a failure of his department (in not anticipating the war).

Criticism was levelled at Ted Rowlands, a former junior foreign minister in the preceding government, who disclosed in Parliament in April 1982 that the British had broken the Argentine diplomatic codes. As the same code machines were used by the Argentine military, this disclosure immediately served to deny British access to valuable intelligence. This, and other responses to parliamentary questions, and leaks of information to the BBC has been alleged by historian Hugh Bicheno to be a deliberate attempt to undermine the Thatcher government on the part of a variety of individuals who had a vested interest in its fall. There is some debate as to the accuracy of the claims regarding Ted Rowlands. Mark Urban in his book UK Eyes Alpha makes reference to a "figure intimate with the workings of GCHQ" who suggested that Rowlands's comment had no noticeable effect.

Ultimately, the successful conclusion of the war gave a noticeable fillip to British patriotic feeling, with the mobilisation of national identity encapsulated in the so-called "Falklands Factor". Since the failure of the 1956 Suez campaign, the end of Empire and the economic decline of the 1970s which culminated in the Winter of Discontent, Britain had been beset by uncertainty and anxiety about its international role, status and capability. With the war successfully concluded, Thatcher was returned to power with an increased Parliamentary majority and felt empowered to press ahead with the economic readjustments of Thatcherism.

A second major effect was a reaffirmation of the special relationship between the US and UK. Both Reagan and Weinberger (his Secretary of Defense) were appointed honorary Knights Commander of the Order of the British Empire (KBE) for their help in the campaign, but the more obvious result was the common alignment of Britain and the US in a more confrontational foreign policy against the Soviet bloc, sometimes known as the Second Cold War.

In 2007 the British government expressed regrets over the deaths on both sides in the war. Margaret Thatcher was quoted as saying "in the struggle against evil... we can all today draw hope and strength" from the Falklands victory, while former Argentinian President Néstor Kirchner claimed while in office that the UK won a colonial victory and vowed that the islands would one day return to Argentine sovereignty. He qualified this, however, with an affirmation that force could never again be used in an attempt to bring this about.

USA and Latin America

The United States' reputation in parts of Latin America was damaged because of the perception that it had broken the Rio Treaty (Inter-American Treaty of Reciprocal Assistance or TIAR) by providing the UK with military supplies.

In September 2001 the then President of Mexico Vicente Fox cited the Falklands War as proof of the failure of the TIAR.

Regarding the attitude of the Latin American governments, K. J. Holsti presents another sight of the South American dilemma: "While South American governments (except Chile) publicly supported Argentina in its conflict with Great Britain, in private many governments were pleased with the outcome of the war. Argentina's bellicosity against Chile over the Beagle Channel problem ... [its] foreign intervention ([in] Bolivia and Nicaragua) ... and [its] propounded geopolitical doctrines that were seen in other countries as threatening to them". So, according to David R. Mares, "Brazilian military analysts worried about the problems of having a successful and belligerent Argentina as neighbour".

For Chile, engaged with Argentina in a long-standing territorial dispute over the Cape Horn islands, the outcome of the war averted a planned Argentine military invasion of Chile and made possible the Treaty of Peace and Friendship of 1984 between Chile and Argentina.

The visit of Pope John Paul II

In May 1982, Pope John Paul II carried out a long-scheduled visit to the United Kingdom. In view of the crisis it was decided that this should be balanced with an unscheduled trip to Argentina in June. It is contended that his presence and words spiritually prepared Argentines for a possible defeat, contrary to the propaganda issued by the Junta. He returned to Argentina in 1987 after the return of democratic government.

Military analysis

Militarily, the Falklands conflict remains the largest air-naval combat operation between modern forces since the end of the Second World War. As such, it has been the subject of intense study by military analysts and historians. The most significant "lessons learned" include the vulnerability of surface ships to anti-ship missiles and submarines, the challenges of coordinating logistical support for a long-distance projection of power, and reconfirmation of the role of tactical air power, including the use of helicopters.

Vulnerability of surface ships
In his book The Price of Admiralty, military historian Sir John Keegan noted that the brief conflict showed the incurable vulnerability of surface ships to anti-ship missiles, and, most importantly, to submarines: despite the seemingly limited consequences of the war, it confirmed the dominance of the submarine in naval warfare. This is especially so, Keegan argues, because submarines are far less vulnerable than aircraft to counterattack, being able to approach and destroy their targets with almost complete impunity.

However, many prominent naval tacticians have recently argued this point; the sinking of the ARA General Belgrano was the result of a modern nuclear-powered submarine hunting a pre-World War II ship with no anti-submarine capabilities, and the British ships sunk by the Argentinian Air Force were acceptable casualties in view of the fact that they were screening forces, either for the British aircraft carriers in the cases of HMS Sheffield and even Atlantic Conveyor, or for the amphibious landing forces as with HMS Coventry, HMS Ardent and HMS Antelope.

Role of air power
Neither side achieved total air supremacy; nonetheless, air power proved to be of critical importance during the conflict, due to the isolated, rough landscape of the Falklands in which the mobility of land forces was restricted. Air strikes were staged against ground, sea and air targets on both sides, and often with clear results. All of the UK losses at sea were caused by aircraft or missile strikes (by both the Argentine Air Force and Naval Aviation). The French Exocet missile proved its lethality in air-to-surface operations, leading to retrofitting of most major ships with Close-in weapon systems (CIWS).

The domination of air power in major naval engagements was demonstrated, along with the usefulness of carriers and it proved the small but manoeuvrable Sea Harrier as a true fighter. Sea Harriers shot down 21 aircraft with no air-to-air losses themselves, although six were lost to ground fire and accidents.

The disparity in figures, with the Argentine fighters failing to shoot down a single Sea Harrier, can be explained by several factors, including limited fighter control that was provided by British warships in San Carlos Water, the then almost unparalleled Blue Fox radar, and the extreme manoeuvrability of the Sea Harrier. Additionally the British had the latest AIM-9L Sidewinder missiles (a gift from USA), while the only Argentine planes with air-to-air missiles for self-defence were the Mirages. The AIM-9Ls had a much wider angle of engagement than the earlier versions employed by the Argentines, which could only effectively engage the rear quarter of an enemy aircraft. The only advantage of the Argentine jets was their higher maximum speed, but Argentine pilots could not benefit from this unless they risked running out of fuel, as was seen in the first air combat of the war when a Mirage IIIEA was forced to attempt a landing at Stanley.

The importance of Airborne Early Warning (AEW) was shown. The Royal Navy had effectively no over-the-horizon radar capability. This was hastily rectified after the war, with Sea King helicopters fitted with radomes containing a variant of the Nimrod ASW aircraft's Searchwater radar.

The usefulness of helicopters in combat, logistic, and casevac operations was confirmed.

Logistics
The logistical capability of the UK armed forces was stretched to the limit in order to mount an amphibious operation so far from a land base, in mountainous islands with few roads. After the war much work was done to improve both the logistical and amphibious capability of the Royal Navy. Task force commander Rear Admiral Sir Sandy Woodward referred to the conflict as "a lot closer run than many would care to believe", reflecting the naval and military belief that few people understood—or understand—the extent to which the logistical dimension made the war a difficult operation for the UK.

The ships of the task force could only remain on station for a limited time in the worsening southern hemisphere winter. With such a high proportion of the Royal Navy's surface fleet engaged, or lost in combat, there were few units available for northbound traffic. At the core of the fleet, Invincible could possibly have been replaced by the hastily prepared Illustrious or the loaned , but there was no replacement available for Hermes, the larger of the two British carriers. Woodward's strategy, therefore, required the land war to be won before Hermes, in particular, succumbed to the harsh environment. Woodward called the operation "a damned close-run thing", quoting the Duke of Wellington after the Battle of Waterloo.

Special forces
The usefulness of special forces units was reaffirmed. British special forces destroyed many Argentine aircraft (notably in the SAS raid on Pebble Island) and carried out highly informative intelligence-gathering operations. Contrary to popular understanding, the Argentine special forces also patrolled hard, in appalling climatic conditions, against a professional enemy and showed that they could sometimes get the upper hand.

Uniforms

Nylon was shown to be a poor choice for fabric in uniforms, as it is more flammable than cotton and also melts with heat. Burning nylon adheres to the skin, causing avoidable casualties.

Impact on the Royal Navy
Strained by two oil crises (1973 and 1979), the United Kingdom's government desired to cut defence spending in line with the rest of Europe. Many former British possessions in Africa and Asia had gained independence from the UK by the 1980s. Due to this decolonisation, successive British governments investigated closing British overseas bases and reducing the UK's armed forces in the belief that capabilities such as a blue water navy were no longer required. The Conservative government's Defence Secretary John Nott produced a white paper in 1981 proposing major cuts for the navy in the next ten years (the army and the RAF had already been tailored for NATO.)

Denis Healey, the Defence Secretary in 1966, once said that aircraft carriers were required only for operations involving 'landing or withdrawal of troops against sophisticated opposition outside range of land-based air cover'. When the last conventional carrier in the Royal Navy, was decommissioned in 1978, the pro-carrier lobby succeeded in acquiring light carriers (euphemistically christened 'through deck cruisers') equipped with VTOL Sea Harriers as well as helicopters, justified by the fact that one of their primary roles was anti-submarine warfare. John Nott's defence review concluded that anti-submarine defence would be performed more cheaply by a smaller number of destroyers and frigates. The carrier  was therefore to be scrapped and  sold to Australia. Under the review, the Royal Navy was focused primarily on anti-submarine warfare under the auspices of NATO. Any out-of-area amphibious operations were considered unlikely.

In 1980, low funding caused many ships to be in harbour for months due to lack of spare parts and fuel. The largest cut in the Royal Navy's conventional forces led to the resignation of the Navy Minister Keith Speed in 1981. Sea battles, mass convoys, amphibious landings, and coastal bombardments were considered obsolete in the second half of the 20th century. The head of the admiralty, First Sea Lord Admiral Sir Henry Leach, was still fighting the cuts in the Ministry of Defence together with the Chief of Defence Staff, who by chance, was also a naval officer – Admiral of the Fleet Sir Terence Lewin.

At the onset of the crisis, First Sea Lord Sir Henry Leach was summoned to brief the Prime Minister. He claimed that Britain was able to recapture the islands, and that it should be done. "Since here was a clear, imminent threat to British overseas territory that could only be reached by sea, what the hell was the point in having a Navy if it was not used for this sort of thing?". Aware of the necessity for speed, Leach had already given orders for the ships of a potential task force to be prepared for deployment. On 2 April, at a briefing at the House of Commons, Leach advised the Prime Minister that a task force was necessary and could sail within 48 hours. Lewin, who was forced to return from a scheduled visit to New Zealand, also impressed on the War Cabinet that the primary objective for the United Kingdom should be: "to bring about the withdrawal of Argentine forces from the Falkland Islands, and the re-establishment of British administration there, as quickly as possible". Inspired, Thatcher ordered the despatch of the Task Force for the South Atlantic.

The principal adjustments to British defence policy as a result of the war were announced in the December 1982 Defence White Paper. After the war, the sale of HMS Invincible to Australia was cancelled, with Hermes offered instead (eventually being sold to India as INS Viraat in 1986), and the operational status of all three support carriers was maintained. The proposed cutback in the surface fleet was abandoned and replacements for many of the lost ships and helicopters plus more Sea Harriers were ordered.

A RN ship is always present in the South Atlantic. In 2007, the Royal Navy confirmed its commitment to a carrier force with the order of two  carriers. In 2012 on the thirtieth anniversary of the war, the air-defence destroyer  visited the Falkland Islands. Since 2015, the Royal Navy has limited its surface presence in the South Atlantic to an Offshore Patrol Vessel on station around the islands and to an ice patrol ship deployed during the South Atlantic summer season. However, both army and RAF units remain deployed at RAF Mount Pleasant in the islands.

Impact on the Argentine Armed Forces

The war's outcome had an indelible impact on the Argentine Armed Forces. The war destroyed the military's image as the "moral reserve of the nation" that they had maintained through most of the 20th century. After 1984, democratic governments in Argentina did not generally approve major military equipment purchases. Argentina's military spending has also been steadily reduced and as of 2010, its devotion of 0.9% of GDP to defence only exceeded Suriname within South America. Within the defence budget itself funding for training and even basic maintenance was significantly cut, a factor contributing to the accidental loss of the Argentine submarine San Juan in 2017. With the United Kingdom also taking active measures to restrict even modest Argentinian military modernization efforts, the result has been a steady erosion of Argentine military capabilities, with some arguing that Argentina had, by the end of the 2010s, ceased to be a capable military power.

Soviet Union
For the Soviet Union and Warsaw Pact militaries, the Falklands War forced a re-examination of their estimates in the quality of Western troops and in particularly, how well an all-volunteer force would compare against conscripted forces. The Soviets became aware that the British relied heavily on the quality and training of their personnel to compensate for the extreme logistical difficulties the campaign presented. It was also noted that both sides were using many of the same western made weapon systems, their combat performance and effectiveness information collected during and after the war was analyzed by the Soviets, to be used to create counter-combat strategies to be adopted by their forces in an event of a then-possible war against NATO.

Weapon export controls
The Coordinating Committee for Multilateral Export Controls (COCOM) failed to anticipate a conflict between Argentina and the UK when approving weapon exports to Argentina.

Allegations of nuclear deployment

In 1982, British warships were routinely armed with the WE.177, a tactical nuclear weapon with a variable yield of either 10 kilotons or 0.5 kiloton, which was used as a Nuclear Depth Bomb in an antisubmarine role. The Official History describes the contorted logistical arrangements that led to the removal of the nuclear depth bombs from the frigates, following political alarm in Whitehall. Eventually at least some of the depth bombs were brought back to the UK by an RFA vessel. In December 2003, Argentine President Néstor Kirchner demanded an apology from the British government for the "regrettable and monstrous" act of arming warships engaged in the conflict with nuclear depth charges.

Intelligence analysis

MI6 activity
In his 2002 memoirs Sir John Nott, Britain's Secretary of State for Defence during the conflict, made following disclosure regarding the activities of the UK's Secret Intelligence Service (MI6):

Norwegian intelligence
According to a documentary by the Norwegian Broadcasting Corporation (NRK), during the war a Norwegian Intelligence Service facility situated at Fauske in the northern county of Nordland regularly intercepted Soviet satellite intelligence data, which was forwarded to the Northwood Headquarters. Said "a high-ranking British military source":

Soviet intervention
According to Russian journalist Sergei Brilev, whose claims were reported in The Times on 2 April 2010, Argentina may have received satellite imagery of British positions from the Soviet Union during the conflict.

Legal
In 2005, an Argentine film called "Blessed by Fire" exposed the mistreatment of Argentine conscripts during the war. That film "led directly to a criminal investigation" which resulted in the filing of formal charges of crimes against humanity against 70 Argentine military officers for the alleged abuse, torture and, in one case, murder of their own troops. However, the Comodoro Rivadavia Criminal Cassation Court ruled that tortures suffered by soldiers are not crimes against humanity thus the Argentine statute of limitations was applicable, and since that time limit had already been exceeded, the court therefore dismissed ["prescribed", in Argentine legal language] the case. On appeal to a higher court, the Comodoro Rivadavia Federal Chamber upheld the lower court's ruling.

Medical

Survival and recovery of wounded British soldiers
During the operations, several wounded British soldiers had to spend hours in the cold before receiving medical aid—yet no British soldier died who was evacuated to a medical aid station, a fact confirmed by Surgeon Commander Rick Jolly, the Medical Officer in Charge of the refrigeration plant at Ajax Bay (nicknamed "The Red and Green Life machine" by the medics). Many recovered better than medical opinion of the time considered possible; subsequent theories have postulated this may have been due to a combination of the extreme cold and the good standards of physical fitness amongst the wounded. Britain also had medical staff familiar with high velocity gunshot wounds, due to their experiences in the Northern Ireland conflict with the IRA.

Medical and psychological treatment of Falklands veterans
The British Ministry of Defence was accused several times of a systematic failure to prepare service personnel for the horrors of war and to provide adequate care for them afterwards.

There are allegations that the Ministry of Defence has tried to ignore the issue of Post Traumatic Stress Disorder (PTSD), which left many sufferers emotionally scarred and unable to work, immersed in social dislocation, alcoholism, and depression. Veterans have suffered prolonged personality disorders, flashbacks, and anxiety sometimes reaching pathological levels.

It has been claimed that more veterans have committed suicide since the Falklands War ended than the number of servicemen killed in action. The South Atlantic Medal Association (SAMA82), which represents and helps Falklands veterans, believes that some 264 veterans had taken their own lives by 2002, a number exceeding the 255 who died in active service, although no estimate is available for the expected number of suicides that would have occurred anyway.

A comprehensive statistical study of the deaths of personnel deployed to the Falklands since the end of the conflict was published by Defence Analytical Services and Advice (DASA) on Tuesday 14 May 2013. The study found that:

{|
|-
| align=right |25,948 || || || || UK Armed Forces personnel served in the Falklands Campaign
|-
| align=right |    237 || || || || personnel died during the campaign
|-
| align=right |  1,335 || || || || Falklands veterans have died since 1982
|-
| align=right |     95 || || || || of these deaths (veterans and in-service) were attributable to suicide and open verdict deaths
|}

The statistics show that 7% of the deaths of Falklands veterans since the campaign were attributed to suicide, significantly less than the number of deaths during the campaign, and that, for Falklands veterans,

The trials of one British patient, Robert Lawrence, MC, were chronicled in a book co-authored by him entitled When The Fighting is Over which was later adapted into a television film. Lawrence was shot at close range by an FN rifle and lost a large percentage of brain matter, but recovered to a degree not thought possible. He remains partially paralysed in the left side of his body. After the war he became an outspoken critic of the British Army's treatment of Falklands veterans.

A similar situation afflicts the veterans on the Argentine side, many of whom have similarly suffered from psychiatric disorders, drug and alcohol abuse, and social turmoil. The current Argentine suicide toll is 454, according to an Argentine film about the suicide of a Falklands veteran.

References

 
Aftermath of wars
Falklands War
Territorial disputes of the United Kingdom
20th-century military history of the United Kingdom
National Reorganization Process